Winona-Montgomery County Airport  is a public use airport located one nautical mile (2 km) south of the central business district of Winona, a city in Montgomery County, Mississippi, United States. It is owned by Winona City and Montgomery County. This airport is included in the National Plan of Integrated Airport Systems for 2011–2015, which categorized it as a general aviation facility.

Facilities and aircraft 
Winona-Montgomery County Airport covers an area of 50 acres (20 ha) at an elevation of 364 feet (111 m) above mean sea level. It has one runway designated 3/21 with an asphalt surface measuring 4,000 by 60 feet (1,219 x 18 m).

For the 12-month period ending February 14, 2012, the airport had 14,630 aircraft operations, an average of 40 per day: 99.6% general aviation and 0.4% military. At that time there were eight aircraft based at this airport: 75% single-engine and 25% ultralight.

See also 
 List of airports in Mississippi

References

External links 
 Aerial image as of February 1996 from USGS The National Map
 
 

Airports in Mississippi
Buildings and structures in Montgomery County, Mississippi
Transportation in Montgomery County, Mississippi